is a 2019 action-adventure hack and slash video game developed by PlatinumGames and published by Nintendo for Nintendo Switch. It was directed by Takahisa Taura, who was previously lead game designer for Nier: Automata, under supervision by Devil May Cry and Bayonetta series creator Hideki Kamiya, and character designs from manga artist Masakazu Katsura.

Set in a dystopian future Earth, the game follows the events of a special police task force that protect remnants of humanity from interdimensional creatures and aberrations that invade the planet, with the story centering on the task force's two new twin recruits. Utilizing the titular "Astral Chain", the twins restrain and tether the creatures, employing them in combat and investigation, referring to them as "Legions". The setting of the game draws heavy inspiration from various cyberpunk manga and anime, while the gameplay combines hack and slash combat with role-playing elements and investigative adventure game sections. These segments revolve heavily around the simultaneous controlling of two characters; the player character twin and their Legion.

Astral Chain was estimated to have had a five-year long development cycle and follows a slate of previous collaborations between PlatinumGames and Nintendo, with both companies having previously worked together on titles such as The Wonderful 101 and Bayonetta 2. The game was announced February 2019 as a part of that month's Nintendo Direct presentation. Astral Chain received highly positive reviews from critics who praised its dual-character gameplay, world building, presentation, customization, and soundtrack, though it received some criticism for its usage of a silent protagonist. As of December 2019, the game has sold over a million copies worldwide, making it one of the best-selling games on the Nintendo Switch.

Gameplay

Astral Chain is an action-adventure game where the player assumes the role of a detective from the "Neuron" special police task force, who are tasked with solving cases and investigating incidents that take place in "The Ark", the game's main world. Exploring the world, questioning non-playable characters and examining evidence yields clues and logic puzzles that become "leads" which further the investigation process. During the course of the game the player will access the "Astral Plane", an interdimensional area where they must traverse hazardous terrain, solve puzzles, and battle enemies, similar to that of traditional video game dungeons.

The player is able to summon a tethered familiar known as a "Legion", bound by a chain that is the game's namesake. Legions come in various different forms sporting different abilities that are used both for puzzle-solving and combat. These include: a sword-based Legion with swift blade attacks that can be used to sever circuitry and interrupt enemy attacks, an archer Legion that can target weak points and distant switches, a Legion with powerful punches that can move large objects, an axe-based Legion which generates a shield and can destroy breakable objects and enemy shields, and a K9 Legion that can track scents, unearth hidden objects, and also be ridden for added mobility and evasiveness. The player begins the game with the Sword Legion, capturing the other four over the course of the game. Legions can be swapped at any time during battle, and can also be upgraded via experience points and unlockable skills. On top of the player's own health, Legions have their own individual health meter that gradually depletes while they are summoned, and they are also susceptible to enemy attacks, which depletes higher amounts of their health. Their health regenerates automatically when they're not active. If the entirety of a Legion's health is depleted, the player becomes unable to utilize it until it has restored all of its health.

Combat takes place in real-time, both melee and ranged weapons are used to fight enemies, predominantly the malevolent race of "Chimeras". The player can summon the Legion during combat in order to have them automatically fight with the player to create combo attacks. The Legion can be manually directed with the right analog stick, allowing the player to position the Legion for more specific maneuvers. Each Legion also has a unique "Legion Action" that allows the player to take direct control over a Legion's signature ability, such as manually aiming and firing projectiles with the Archer Legion, or using the Arm Legion as protective armor that can hover over hazardous terrain and attack with a flurry of punches. Additional skills include being able to perform powerful health-restorative finishing moves, unchaining a Legion to summon multiple at once, using the chain that connects the player to the Legion in order to bind enemies—referred to as a "Chain Bind"—and also using the chain as an arresting wire on enemies that attempt charging into the player—referred to as a "Chain Counter". The player is also able to utilize the chain in order to zip line out of danger through enemy crowds, as well as crossing gaps and bottomless pits between buildings and platforms.

Completing combos, interrupting enemy attacks, restraining enemies, dodging, and deploying a Legion at the correct moment will offer the player a chance to perform a sync attack, requiring the player to press the left trigger at the right instant, similar to a quick time event. Sync attacks can extend combos, trigger special attacks, bind enemies, and help the player recover from a fall. After performing a large number of sync attacks, the player may fuse with their Legion for a short while to recover health and deal large amounts of damage.

The game features four difficulty settings, allowing the player to switch difficulty between each chapter. The highest difficulty is only unlocked for a corresponding chapter once the player has beaten it once. When played on the two highest difficulties, the game ranks the player based on their individual case performance, giving the player an overall ranking at the end of each chapter. On the two lowest difficulties, the player will not be ranked.

Early in the game players unlock the IRIS tool, a heads up display from which they can inspect the environment and search for clues, as well as save their progress, manage the inventory, customize in-game menus, view the level map, and manage orders (benchmarks and photo challenges that reward the player with items, crafting materials, XP, money, and photo filters). Previously completed chapters can be accessed and replayed via the player's desk at the Neuron Headquarters at the beginning of each new chapter. The player can also return to this area to maintain and customize their Legions, customize their character, and interact with other Neuron officers. Consumable items can also be obtained from vendors that can later be used for crafting, health recovery, or combat.

Plot

Setting and characters
Astral Chain is set in the year 2078, where humanity is on the brink of extinction. The remnants of the human populace have retreated to a megacity called "The Ark", which rests on a massive artificial island. The world is under attack by interdimensional lifeforms called "Chimeras", which reside in the "Astral Plane"; a vast parallel dimension composed of crystallized data that is uninhabitable to humans. The Chimeras cause destruction, drag civilians into the Astral Plane via wormholes, and spread "red matter" that corrupts living things and humans. To combat the Chimeras, the "Neuron" Police Task Force is employed. They utilize "Legions"—subservient Chimeras that have been tethered to an officer via a psychic chain, utilizing them for combat and investigation.

The player assumes the role of one of two twin police officers, who join Neuron early into the game as new recruits. The player-selected character has a custom identity, whereas their opposite-gender sibling becomes "Akira Howard". The two twins were adopted by the current Neuron Captain, Maximilian Howard. Other characters include Neuron Commander and scientific genius Yoseph Calvert; Chief Medical Officer and scientist Brenda Moreno; fellow veteran officers Alicia Lopez and Jin Wong who assist the players on the field; Neuron Dispatcher and former TV newscaster Olive Espinosa; and the Neuron Office Manager Marie Wentz. The Neuron officers are also assisted by a hacker named Harold "Hal" Clark, who pilots a modified field drone.

Story
The Player and Akira are dispatched to respond to an aberration attack, but are quickly outmatched by Chimeras. The twins are saved by Neuron officers Max, Alicia, and Jin, who wield Legions capable of fighting them. Yoseph assigns Legions to the Player and Akira, enabling them to repel the Chimeras. Afterwards, the twins are both formally inducted into Neuron. Their first investigation mission goes awry when the Player ends up being pulled into the Astral Plane, causing the rest of the squad to pursue them into the Astral Plane to save them. Due to prolonged Astral Plane exposure having the effect of weakening humans, the Neuron officers lose control over their Legions, causing them to break free and go berserk. In the end, only the Player is successful in subduing their Legion. Max battles the remaining frenzied Legions and sacrifices himself to allow the rest of the squad to escape. Meanwhile, Neuron's Legion production facility is attacked and put out of commission, leaving the Player as the only officer with access to a Legion.

The Player is sent on further missions to respond to Chimera attacks, eventually recapturing the lost Legions in the process. During this time, the twins come into contact with Dr. Jena Anderson, a former pupil of Yoseph's who is instigating Chimera attacks and bears a grudge against UNION, the Ark's ruling government. She manages to critically wound Akira while evading capture and leaves behind clues to the Player to investigate Zone 09, a quarantined section of the Ark which Neuron officers are forbidden from entering. The Player goes undercover and explores Zone 09 with Hal, discovering that UNION developed a drug called Blue Evolve that could allow humans to fight Chimeras, which also carried the side effect of turning the users into Aberrations. After battling one of Jena's chimeric homonculi, they are saved by a recovered Akira, who has obtained a new Legion. As a result of entering Zone 09 without permission, the Player is jailed for insubordination, and Hal goes into hiding to avoid arrest.

After another wave of Chimera attacks occur, Neuron is forced to provisionally release the Player to combat them. Jena stages a large scale invasion of the Ark, announcing her intention to save humanity by merging Earth with the Astral Plane, which serves as a collective memory bank of humanity. The skirmish leaves Neuron's headquarters defenseless, allowing Jena to infiltrate it and take Yoseph hostage. The twins arrive to rescue Yoseph, causing Jena to power herself up with Blue Evolve before battling the Player. During the battle, the Player unwittingly ends up fully merging with their Legion and goes berserk, attacking Akira. Jena distracts the transformed Player and sacrifices herself in the process, warning them that this is the true form of their Legion's power. Yoseph then calls in the Ravens—a newly created task force of Legion users—and orders them to kill the Player, causing them to fall off an overpass.

The Player wakes up back in their human form, having been rescued by Hal and Olive, and brought into a hiding place in Zone 09. Hal explains that Yoseph has largely replaced Neuron with the Ravens and is actively hunting the Player, accusing them of treason. While carrying out a covert rescue operation to retrieve Brenda from Neuron, the crew are confronted by Akira, who tries to convince the Player to return to Neuron, but they are ambushed by the Raven unit, revealing themselves to be clones of Akira. The Ravens attack Akira, causing Akira to inadvertently merge with their Legion and go on a rampage. To stop Akira, the Player willingly merges with their own Legion and manages to knock Akira back into their human form.

Wanting to find out and stop Yoseph's plans, the twins stage an assault on his lab. After being confronted, Yoseph uses the Ravens as a catalyst to create the ultimate Legion, Noah, and merges himself with it, intending to absorb all life on Earth in order to become a god. Akira ends up being absorbed into Noah while trying to protect the Player. The Player battles Noah and weakens him enough to allow Akira to temporarily seize control of Noah's body, allowing the Player to destroy Noah, but killing Akira in the process.

Following Noah's destruction, Chimera attacks begin to decrease drastically, allowing humans to consider leaving the Ark and repopulating the Earth. Alicia and Jin put Neuron back together, with Olive as interim commander, and the task force continues to handle the few Chimera attacks that still occur on the Ark. Akira is also revealed to have survived through one of their remaining clones, having been transplanted memories by Brenda using traces found in the original's Legion.

Development

The development of Astral Chain preceded the release of Nier: Automata, with PlatinumGames estimating that the game had been in the works for roughly five years between its conceptualizing and eventual release. With the assistance of former Scalebound and PlatinumGames producer Jean Pierre Kellams, the game was pitched to Nintendo after the company requested the development of a new game with high difficulty. Despite comparisons to Scalebound dual-character gameplay, PlatinumGames producer Atsushi Inaba has explained that the two games are very different in concept, and sees Astral Chain as an evolution of their previous action games. Internally, the company refers to the game as a "synergetic action game". Takahisa Taura was appointed as director due to his previous work on Nier: Automata, and the company's belief that they need to foster multiple directors that can bring a different flavor for each of their individual projects.

Astral Chain was initially envisioned as a fantasy game where the player would utilize magic, however at Nintendo's recommendation the game was changed to a cyberpunk setting as they felt it would make for a more unique setting. Taura explained that the game's setting was inspired by various anime such as Ghost in the Shell and Appleseed, as well as the works of Masakazu Katsura, who was hired to be the game's character designer. While the ability to play as male or female was always intended as an option, the game initially did not feature twin protagonists in the project's early stages. The decision to make the lead characters twins came about from ideas based on Katsura's concept sketches for the protagonists. The inclusion of character customization was also done to help the player immerse themselves into the world.

The gameplay of Astral Chain is designed around controlling two characters at once, which Taura has said comprises the core of the game itself, comparing it to the way the "Wicked Weaves" ability is the core of Bayonetta. The developers also took plenty of inspiration from Libble Rabble with the dual-character concept. World building was considered important during development; the developers wanted to showcase the police performing day-to-day tasks and services beyond crime fighting, and built an expanded cast around such to accommodate. Taura noted that the main difference in approach compared to PlatinumGames' work on Nier: Automata was that Astral Chain had its scenario built around the gameplay rather than the other way around.

When asked about the possibility of Astral Chain becoming available on multiple platforms in a February 2020 interview (focused on the then-recently announced Kickstarter campaign for the remastered The Wonderful 101), Inaba stated that "it's too early to say", and that "ultimately, it's Nintendo's call, not [theirs]". Fans had later noted in January 2021 that the game's copyright notice on PlatinumGames' website had changed to show Nintendo having full ownership of the title, despite previous claims that the property was co-owned. Inaba would confirm this change in an interview the very same month, stating Nintendo now have full ownership of the intellectual property, though they were not at liberty to disclose the specifics of the change.

Music 
The score for Astral Chain was primarily written and produced by Satoshi Igarashi, who previously worked on Bayonetta 2. Igarashi revealed that the background music will change genres depending on the mood of the scene. For example, dramatic scenes will use orchestral music, scenes with more tension will start to use more metal music and the calm scenes are more likely to use electronic music.

Nintendo proposed to PlatinumGames the idea of partnering with Avex Group to acquire vocalists for the game's theme songs. William Aoyama, of the Japanese pop group Intersection; and Beverly, who performed the theme song for the 2019 anime adaptation of Fruits Basket; were ultimately picked by Igarashi and Taura to perform vocals on three separate theme songs. The decision of hiring two vocalists was made to represent the game's dual protagonists. The opening theme song called "Savior" plays during the game's opening sequence, which Taura requested be made as an anime opening. "Dark Hero" serves as a featured song within the game, and "The Answer" acts as the ending theme song.

Reception 

On Metacritic, Astral Chain holds an aggregated score of 87/100, indicating "generally favorable reviews". In a non-scored review, Eurogamer review editor Martin Robinson awarded the game with an "Essential" ranking, referring to the game as PlatinumGames' best game to date, citing that it "shines brighter than anything in the studio's past." Steven Petite of IGN praised the combat, commenting that "though Astral Chain lacks a deep combo system, it makes up for that and then some with its roster of Legions". Destructoid reviews director Chris Carter pointed out that while the game has a slightly slow start, he was "completely sold" once the game introduced customization, while also praising the bosses and the game's variety of enemies.

The game received criticism for its use of a silent protagonist. Francesco De Meo of Wccftech concluded that the decision to have a silent protagonist "doesn't really work well in the context of the story, considering the same character is fully voiced if not picked as main character at the beginning of the game"; a sentiment that was echoed by Game Informer and GameSpot. Despite this, the game generally received praise for its side characters and world building. Writing for Polygon, Chris Plante highlighted the game's non-combat side activities that involves the player investigating and performing helpful tasks toward non-player characters, citing that the game is "a deeply human game about a group of people striving to do good—not just on the world-saving level, but on the minute-to-minute level, during a time when the future seems incredibly bleak", concluding by calling the game Nintendo's best new IP since Splatoon.

The game became a target of review-bombing by Metacritic users, primarily for being an exclusive Nintendo Switch game. Fire Emblem: Three Houses, another title also published by Nintendo, was review-bombed at around the same time for similar reasons, with users countering the negative scores on both games with 10/10 scores. The review bombs on both Astral Chain and Fire Emblem: Three Houses were later removed by Metacritic.

Sales 
Astral Chain launched at #1 on the UK physical charts, #2 on the Japanese physical charts, and #10 on the NPD charts for August. The game sold 46,875 physical copies within its first three weeks on sale in Japan. PlatinumGames tweeted a commemorative picture a week after launch, thanking fans for making the game a success. While full sales numbers weren't disclosed at the time, Taura mentioned in an interview with Famitsu that Astral Chain had outperformed the companies' sales expectations. As of March 2020, the game has sold 1.08 million copies worldwide. The 2022 CESA Games White Papers revealed that Astral Chain had sold 1.28 million units, as of December 31, 2021.

Awards
The game won the award for "Nintendo Game of the Year", and came in tenth place for "Game of the Year" at the 2019 Edge Awards.

Notes

References

External links
 

2019 video games
Action video games
Cooperative video games
Hack and slash games
Masakazu Katsura
Multiplayer and single-player video games
Open-world video games
Nintendo games
Nintendo Switch games
Nintendo Switch-only games
PlatinumGames games
Science fiction video games
Video games about police officers
Video games developed in Japan
Video games about parallel universes
Video games featuring protagonists of selectable gender
Video games set in the 2070s
Video games with cel-shaded animation